The Business Times of Kuala Lumpur has been published in Malaysia since 4 October 1976. It is part of the New Straits Times publishing group. The newspaper has been incorporating with the New Straits Times since 1 June 2002.

History
The Business Times originally distributed with The Straits Times, both published in Singapore. After new law in both Singapore (1975) and Malaysia (1970s) regarding ownership of the publisher, the New Straits Times was founded in Kuala Lumpur on the basis of The Straits Times, Malaysia edition. The Business Times followed the foundation of the New Straits Times and rebirth in Kuala Lumpur also.

External links 
 Business Times of Kuala Lumpur

Newspapers published in Malaysia
Business newspapers
Publications established in 1976
Mass media in Kuala Lumpur
1976 establishments in Malaysia
Business in Malaysia